Brett Ryan Ferres (born 17 April 1986) is an English professional rugby league footballer who last played for Doncaster RLFC in the RFL League 1, and has played for England at international level, initially as a  and later as a  or .

He has previously played for the Bradford Bulls, Wakefield Trinity Wildcats, Castleford Tigers (Heritage № 895), Huddersfield Giants and the Leeds Rhinos in the Super League.

Background
Ferres was born in Castleford, West Yorkshire, England.

Playing career

Bradford Bulls
Ferres was a member of the England academy side that toured Australia and New Zealand in 2004. In 2005 he made 9 first team appearances for Bradford Bulls, and was the regular goal kicker for the senior academy, a side he also captained, scoring 17 tries in only 17 appearances for the under-21s.
As Super League champions Bradford faced National Rugby League premiers Wests Tigers in the 2006 World Club Challenge, Ferres played from the interchange bench in Bradford's 30–10 victory.

Wakefield Trinity Wildcats
In late 2006, Ferres signed for Wakefield Trinity in exchange for David Solomona who went to the Bradford club.

Castleford Tigers
Ferres signed for Castleford on 7 November 2008 after being released from his contract with Wakefield Trinity.

On 2 July 2009 Ferres signed a new three-year deal to stay at Castleford.

Huddersfield Giants
In July 2012, Ferres signed for Huddersfield for a three-and-a-half-year deal. He was named at second-row in the 2013 Super League Dream Team. Immediately following the test series against New Zealand, Ferres was suspended by Huddersfield pending an investigation into his "conduct away from the club".

Leeds Rhinos
In January 2016, Leeds signed Brett Ferres from Huddersfield for an undisclosed fee.

He played in the 2017 Super League Grand Final victory over Castleford at Old Trafford.

International career
Ferres won caps for England in 2006 against France, Tonga (2 matches) and Samoa in the 2006 Federation Shield tournament.

In 2013, Ferres was named in the English squad for the 2013 Rugby League World Cup. Ferres was selected after Gareth Hock breached team policy and was removed from the squad. Ferres featured in every game England played.

In 2014, Ferres played for England in the 2014 Four Nations held in Australia and New Zealand.

In 2015, Ferres was selected in the England 24-man squad to take on New Zealand in a test-series. Before the series began England played a match against France. Brett scored 3 of the 15 tries scored by England in the match in what was a demolishing of their opponents.

In 2016, Ferres was initially selected in the England 24-man squad for the 2016 Four Nations, but had to withdraw due to a knee injury.

Honours

Club
Super League: 2017
League Leaders' Shield: 2013
World Club Challenge: 2006

International
Baskerville Shield: 2015

References

External links
Leeds Rhinos profile

SL profile
Search for "Brett Ferres" AND "Rugby League" at BBC → Sport

1986 births
Living people
Bradford Bulls players
Castleford Tigers players
Doncaster R.L.F.C. players
England national rugby league team players
English rugby league players
Featherstone Rovers players
Huddersfield Giants players
Leeds Rhinos players
Rugby league centres
Rugby league locks
Rugby league players from Castleford
Rugby league second-rows
Wakefield Trinity players